The 2020 Greek Cup Final was the 76th final of the Greek Football Cup. It took place on 12 September 2020 at Panthessaliko Stadium, between AEK Athens and Olympiacos. It was AEK Athens' twenty fifth Greek Cup Final and fifth consecutive, of their 96-year history and Olympiacos' fortieth Greek Cup Final in their 93 years of existence. The Final was originally scheduled for 26 July and was postponed to 30 August because of Olympiacos' pressure in HFF to change the stadium from Georgios Kamaras Stadium to Olympic Stadium and after the refusal of the Hellenic Police in the first stadium. The Final was rescheduled for 30 August in the Olympic Stadium but it was postponed again because 2 days before the game Olympiacos' player, Maximiliano Lovera was tested positive for COVID-19. The Final was rescheduled again for 12 September at Panthessaliko Stadium. Due to the delay of the match, the teams had to compete without the players acquired from the 2020 summer transfer period, by decision of the UEFA.

Venue

This was the third Greek Cup Final held at the Panthessaliko Stadium after the 2007 and 2017 final.

The Panthessaliko Stadium was built in 2004. The stadium is used as a venue for Niki Volos and Volos. Its current capacity is 22,700.

Background
AEK Athens had reached the Greek Cup Final twenty four times, winning fourteen of them. The last time that they had won the Cup was in 2016 (2–1 against Olympiacos). The last time that had played in a Final was in 2019, where they had lost to PAOK by 1–0.

Olympiacos had reached the Greek Cup Final thirty eight times, winning twenty seven of them. The last time they had won the Cup was in 2015 (3–1 against Skoda Xanthi). The last time that had played in a Final was in 2019, where they had lost to AEK Athens by 2–1.

Route to the final

Match

Details

References

2020
Cup Final
Greek Cup Final 2020
Greek Cup Final 2016
Sport in Volos
September 2020 sports events in Europe